Rachel Kaprielian (born June 24, 1968) is an American politician who served as a member of the Massachusetts House of Representatives, Massachusetts Registrar of Motor Vehicles, and Massachusetts Secretary of Labor and Workforce Development.

Biography
Kaprielian was born in 1968 in Boston, Massachusetts. From 1995 to 2008 Kaprielian represented portions of Cambridge and Watertown in the Massachusetts House of Representatives. She finished her law studies at Suffolk University in 2000 and received a Masters of Public Service from Harvard University in 2003. In May 2008 she accepted an appointment as the Massachusetts Registrar of Motor Vehicles from Governor Deval Patrick. She was named Secretary of Labor and Workforce Development on January 17, 2014.

In 2015 she was appointed Regional Director (MA, RI, CT, VT, ME, NH) for the United States Department of Health and Human Services.

References

External links

Biography, via Mass. RMV

|-

1968 births
Living people
State cabinet secretaries of Massachusetts
Democratic Party members of the Massachusetts House of Representatives
Women state legislators in Massachusetts
United States Department of Health and Human Services officials
American people of Armenian descent
Harvard Kennedy School alumni
21st-century American politicians
21st-century American women politicians
20th-century American politicians
20th-century American women politicians
Ethnic Armenian politicians
Massachusetts Registrars of Motor Vehicles